Light Years Away is a 1981 film directed by Alain Tanner. It tells the story of a young man who meets an old man who says he was taught by birds how to fly and is building a flying machine. It is based on a novel by Daniel Odier.

Although filmed in English and shot in Ireland, it was made by a Swiss director and produced by companies from France and Switzerland. The film won the Grand Prix  at the 1981 Cannes Film Festival.

Cast
 Trevor Howard as Yoshka Poliakeff
 Mick Ford as Jonas
 Bernice Stegers as Betty
 Henri Virlojeux as Lawyer
 Gerard Mannix Flynn as Drunken Boy (as Mannix Flynn)
 Don Foley as Cafe Owner
 Gabrielle Keenan as Girl At Village Dance
 John Murphy as Man In Bar
 Jerry O'Brien as Bar Owner
 Joe Pilkington as Thomas
 Louis Samier as Trucker
 Odile Schmitt as Dancer
 Vincent Smith as Cop

References

External links 

French aviation films
1981 films
Swiss drama films
1981 drama films
Films directed by Alain Tanner
Films shot in Ireland
English-language French films
English-language Swiss films
Cannes Grand Prix winners
1980s English-language films
1980s French films